Make Believe is the first album by Swedish pop band Pineforest Crunch, released in early 1996.  By the end of the year the album had gone gold, and first single "Cup Noodle Song" had reached number 3 in the Swedish charts.

Track listing

Personnel
Åsa Eklund: vocals, flute
Mats Lundgren: bass, melotron and other keyboards
Olle Söderström: vocals, acoustic guitar, 12 stringed electric guitar on "Unleased"
Jonas Petterson: electric guitar, clarinet, nylon acoustic on "Poor Little Man"
Mattias Olsson: drums, cymbals and assorted devices

References

1996 albums